Eichwald may refer to:

 Eichwald (surname)
 Eichwald porcelain
 part of the city of Kassel, Germany
 part of the village of Schönborn, Germany

See also 
 Chalampé, Alsace, France (German: Eichwald)
 Dubí, Czech Republic (formerly Eichwald, Bohemia)
 Eichwalde